Zeta Omega Eta is a sorority founded at Trinity College in Hartford, Connecticut. , there are two feminist sororities in the United States, one at Trinity College and on at the University of Michigan in Ann Arbor, Michigan.

As outlined in the Constitution of the Sisterhood, Zeta Omega Eta is a non-traditional sisterhood devoted to diversity, inclusiveness, and the advancement of feminist ideals. Inherent in the goals of Zeta Omega Eta is a commitment to action and engagement on the campus, in the community, and in the world. Through their work in community service, their roles as leaders in campus organizations, and their pursuit of academic excellence, Zetas seek to reclaim and redefine what it means to be a feminist and to be a sorority sister.

The Alpha chapter of the Sisterhood of Zeta Omega Eta was started at Trinity College in 2003 by then Sophomore Meghan Boone as part of a project for Tutorial College. As outlined in the Constitution of the Sisterhood, Zeta Omega Eta is a non-traditional sisterhood devoted to diversity, inclusiveness, and the advancement of feminist ideals. Inherent in the goals of Zeta Omega Eta is a commitment to action and engagement on the campus, in the community, and in the world. Through their work in community service, their roles as leaders in campus organizations, and their pursuit of academic excellence. As of 2007, Trinity College has recognized Zeta Omega Eta as an active Greek organization on campus. Subsequently, Zeta has been granted two seats on the Inter-Greek Council, an organization which seeks to steer the role of the Greeks on campus.

As of 2006, Zeta began hosting an annual Young Women's Leadership Conference, which invites girls from the surrounding middle schools to come to the College for a series of discussions and activities which allow them to explore what is ahead in their future as leaders, feminists, and students. The Young Women's Leadership Conference seeks to encourage young women to pursue their dreams and to interact with college women who are available to answer their questions in an open, enthusiastic environment.

Zeta is also known for its annual Women in Academia banquet which honors Trinity's female professors and college employees for their pursuits in academia, their roles as female leaders on campus, and their achievements for the Trinity College community. Participants and speakers at the event explore the continuing issue of women's roles in higher education, and to celebrate the triumphs of the women in academia at our college.
Interest in the work and achievements of Zeta Omega Eta have led to the publication of several articles regarding the organization in Bust magazine, the Hartford Courant, the Trinity Tripod, Bitch magazine, and salon.com among others.

Currently the only active chapter of Zeta is at the University of Michigan. It was founded by then sophomore Courtney Cook in 2015. At Michigan Zeta's primary philanthropic cause is Out of the Darkness, a charitable organization dedicated to suicide awareness and prevention. Zeta Omega Eta at UM continues to uphold the feminist values that the alpha chapter at Trinity were founded on.

References

Feminism in the United States
Student societies in the United States
Fraternities and sororities in the United States
Student organizations established in 2003
Trinity College (Connecticut)
Women in Connecticut
2003 establishments in Connecticut